Andromeda Peters is an American beauty pageant titleholder from Springfield, Virginia that was crowned Miss United States 2018. Peters is a licensed clinical therapist with a Bachelor of Science in Psychology and a Master of Science in Social Work. She is an advocate for mental health awareness, especially within black communities. Peters has two fathers; one is a Ghanaian highlife musician and the other is Indigenous American, Nigerian, Filipino, and British, and transgender.

References

Year of birth missing (living people)
Living people
American beauty pageant winners